Rattling Run may refer to:

Rattling Run (Catawissa Creek)
Rattling Run (Little Mahanoy Creek)